The Aeromarine 50, also called the Limousine Flying Boat, was a luxury seaplane.

Design and development
After the First World War, Aeromarine had completed over 300 aircraft. Production was centered on seaplanes for sport and commercial use. President Inglis M. Uppercu, marketed the seaplane based in its luxury interior.

The aircraft was a biplane seaplane with a two-pilot open cockpit and enclosed seating for three passengers. The engine was mounted in a pusher configuration.

Operational history
One Aeromarine 50 was purchased by Aero Limited for New York-Atlantic City flights. Aeromarine Airways also operated Model 50 flying boats.

Variants
Aeromarine 50B
Fully enclosed variant
Aeromarine 50C
 Hispano Suiza powered version
Aeromarine 50 "S"
a commercial passenger variant.

Specifications (Aeromarine 50)

References

Flying boats
050
Single-engined pusher aircraft
1910s United States civil aircraft
Biplanes
Aircraft first flown in 1919